A reluctance motor is a type of electric motor that induces non-permanent magnetic poles on the ferromagnetic rotor. The rotor does not have any windings. It generates torque through magnetic reluctance.

Reluctance motor subtypes include synchronous, variable, switched and variable stepping.

Reluctance motors can deliver high power density at low cost, making them attractive for many applications. Disadvantages include high torque ripple (the difference between maximum and minimum torque during one revolution) when operated at low speed, and noise due to torque ripple.

Until the early twenty-first century, their use was limited by the complexity of designing and controlling them. Advances in theory, computer design tools, and low-cost embedded systems for control overcame these obstacles. Microcontrollers use real-time computing control algorithms to tailor drive waveforms according to rotor position and current/voltage feedback. Before the development of large-scale integrated circuits, the control electronics were prohibitively costly.

Design and operating fundamentals
The stator consists of multiple projecting (salient) electromagnet poles, similar to a wound field brushed DC motor. The rotor consists of soft magnetic material, such as laminated silicon steel, which has multiple projections acting as salient magnetic poles through magnetic reluctance. For switched reluctance motors, the number of rotor poles is typically less than the number of stator poles, which minimizes torque ripple and prevents the poles from all aligning simultaneously—a position that cannot generate torque.

When a stator pole is equidistant from two adjacent rotor poles, the stator pole is said to be in the "fully unaligned position". This is the position of maximum magnetic reluctance for the rotor pole. In the "aligned position", two (or more) rotor poles are fully aligned with two (or more) stator poles, (which means the rotor poles completely face the stator poles) and is a position of minimum reluctance.

When a stator pole is energized, the rotor torque is in the direction that reduces reluctance. Thus, the nearest rotor pole is pulled from the unaligned position into alignment with the stator field (a position of less reluctance). (This is the same effect used by a solenoid, or when picking up ferromagnetic metal with a magnet.) To sustain rotation, the stator field must rotate in advance of the rotor poles, thus constantly "pulling" the rotor along. Some motor variants run on 3-phase AC power (see the synchronous reluctance variant below). Most modern designs are of the switched reluctance type, because electronic commutation gives significant control advantages for motor starting, speed control and smooth operation (low torque ripple).

The inductance of each phase winding in the motor varies with position, because the reluctance also varies with position. This presents a control systems challenge.

Types

Synchronous reluctance
Synchronous reluctance motors have an equal number of stator and rotor poles. The projections on the rotor are arranged to introduce internal flux “barriers“, holes that direct the magnetic flux along the so-called direct axis. The number of poles must be even, typically 4 or 6.

The rotor operates at synchronous speeds without current-conducting parts. Rotor losses are minimal compared to those of an induction motor, however it doesn't normally have a lot of torque.

Once started at synchronous speed, the motor can operate with sinusoidal voltage. Speed control requires a variable-frequency drive.

Switched reluctance or variable reluctance

The switched reluctance motor (SRM) is a form of stepper motor that uses fewer poles. The most rudimentary form of a SRM has the lowest construction cost of any electric motor because of its simple structure, and even industrial motors may have some cost reduction due to the lack of rotor windings or permanent magnets. Common uses include applications where the rotor must be held stationary for long periods, and in potentially explosive environments such as mining because it operates without a mechanical commutator.

The phase windings in an SRM are electrically isolated from each other, resulting in higher fault tolerance than inverter-driven AC induction motors. The optimal drive waveform is not a pure sinusoid, due to the non-linear torque relative to rotor displacement, and the highly position-dependent inductance of the stator phase windings.

Applications

Analog electric meters
Analog electric clocks
Some washing machine designs
Control rod drive mechanisms of nuclear reactors
Hard disk drive motor
Electric vehicles
Power tools such as drill presses, lathes, and bandsaws

See also 
  Electric vehicle motor
 Flux switching alternator, a similar machine arrangement, used as a generator.
 Switched reluctance motor
 Stepping motor

References

External links 

 Real-Time Simulation of Switched Reluctance Motor Drives Technical Paper

Electric motors